Bratwin  (German:Brattwin) is a village in the administrative district of Gmina Dragacz, within Świecie County, Kuyavian-Pomeranian Voivodeship, in north-central Poland.

References

Bratwin